On Such a Night may refer to either:

 On Such a Night (1937 film), an American drama film directed by Ewald André Dupont
 On Such a Night (1956 film), a British short comedy film directed by Anthony Asquith.